Thiên is a Vietnamese word which can refer to:

 Thiền, a Vietnamese version of Zen Buddhism

People
 Lê Hoàng Thiên
 Mẫu Thượng Thiên
 Quốc Thiên
 Thiên Y A Na
 Thừa Thiên (empress)
 Thuận Thiên (Trần dynasty empress)
 Thuận Thiên (Nguyễn dynasty empress)

See also 

 Thien (disambiguation)
 Thiene
 Thoen (disambiguation)